Carex brachyanthera is a species of sedge that was first formally named by Jisaburo Ohwi in 1934. It is native to parts of eastern Asia and Oceania.

References

brachyanthera
Plants described in 1934